Valery Ivanovich Jacobi ( or Якобий; , Kudryakovo, Kazan Governorate, Russia - 13 May 1902, Nizza, France) was a Russian painter and an older brother of Pavel Jacobi (1842–1913), a notable revolutionary and ethnographer.

Biography
Valery Jacobi was born to a family of an estate owner and started his education in the Kazan University, but broke off studying to enlist in the Russian Army (Siberian Volunteer Corps) during the Crimean War. In 1856 after retirement from the Army he decided to abandon his University studies and pursue an artistic career instead.

In 1856-1861 he studied at the Imperial Academy of Arts, receiving a small gold medal for his painting "Serene Holiday of a Beggar" (1860). In 1861 he painted what may be his most notable painting "The Prisoner's Rest". In 1861-1869 Jacobi traveled to Europe with an Academy grant, visiting Germany, Switzerland, France and Italy.

In 1870 Jacobi became one of the founding members of the Peredvizhniki art society. But in 1872 he was excluded for his failure to participate in a society exhibition and his general disagreement with the ideals of the society. Later he was considered a conservative, sceptical to the Peredvizhniki's ideas.

Jacobi was a member of the Imperial Academy of Arts after 1868, became a professor in 1871 and taught at the Academy from 1878-1889. He lived mostly in Saint Petersburg creating historical paintings like "Jesters at the Court of Anna Ioanovna" (1872), "Ice Palace" (1878), etc. His works were criticized as purely decorative and lacking in substance.

After a major reorganization of the Academy in 1891, he was dismissed and began dividing his time between Saint Petersburg, Algeria and France. Jacobi died in Nice in 1902.

Works

References

External links

1834 births
1902 deaths
People from Laishevsky Uyezd
Peredvizhniki
19th-century painters from the Russian Empire
Russian male painters
Russian realist painters
Expatriates from the Russian Empire in France
19th-century male artists from the Russian Empire